Paraplatybunus is a genus of harvestmen in the family Phalangiidae.

Species
 Paraplatybunus decui Dumitrescu, 1970
 Paraplatybunus triangularis (Herbst, 1799)

References

Harvestmen
Harvestman genera